The Newlands Resolution was a joint resolution passed on July 7, 1898, by the United States Congress to annex the independent Republic of Hawaii. In 1900, Congress created the Territory of Hawaii.

The resolution was drafted by Representative Francis G. Newlands of Nevada, a Democrat. Annexation was a highly controversial political issue, along with the similar issue of the acquisition of the Philippines in 1898.

Passage
In 1897, US President William McKinley signed a treaty of annexation for the Republic of Hawaii which lacked 2/3 support in the Senate and thus never went into effect.  In April 1898, the United States went to war with Spain. The Republic of Hawaii decided not to support the war effort and declared its neutrality.  According to Ralph S. Kuykendall, "The Hawaiian government threw aside its neutrality and did all it could to aid the Americans....Honolulu became a mid-ocean stopover for the United States troops that were sent across the Pacific to follow up Dewey's victory. The American soldiers were enthusiastically welcomed and given a taste of Hawaiian hospitality." Hawaii's support demonstrated its value as a naval base in wartime and won widespread American approval for its help. With the opposition weakened, Hawaii was annexed by the Newlands Resolution, by way of Congressional-executive agreement method, which requires only a majority vote in both houses. Although the bill was authored by a Democrat, most of its support came from Republicans. It passed the house by a vote of 209 to 91; supporters included 182 Republicans. It passed the Senate by a two-thirds majority vote of 42–21. It was approved on July 4, 1898, and signed on July 7 by McKinley. On August 12, a ceremony was held on the steps of ʻIolani Palace to signify the official transfer of Hawaiian state sovereignty to the United States. Some Hawaiian citizens did not recognize the event's legitimacy and did not attend.

The resolution established a five-member commission to study the laws that were needed in Hawaii. The commission included Territorial Governor Sanford B. Dole (R-Hawaii Territory), Senators Shelby M. Cullom (R-IL) and John T. Morgan (D-AL), Representative Robert R. Hitt (R-IL) and former Hawaii Chief Justice and later Territorial Governor Walter F. Frear (R-Hawaii Territory). The commission's final report was submitted to Congress for a debate that lasted over a year. Congress raised objections that establishing an elected territorial government in Hawaii would lead to the admission of a state with a non-white majority. Annexation allowed duty-free trade between the islands and the mainland, although this had mostly already been accomplished through a reciprocity trade deal King David Kalakaua had made with the U.S. in 1875, and in exchange gave the U.S. Navy a long term lease of Pearl Harbor for a Naval Base.

The creation of the Territory of Hawaii was the final step in a long history of dwindling Hawaiian sovereignty and divided the local population. The annexation was opposed by some among the Polynesian population and occurred without a referendum of any kind. Debate between anti-sovereignty and Hawaiian sovereignty sovereignty activism still exists over the legality of the acquisition of Hawaii under the US constitution. The Hawaiian sovereignty movement views the annexation as illegal.  However, the U.S. Supreme Court gave tacit recognition to the legitimacy of Hawaii's annexation in De Lima v. Bidwell, 182 U.S. 1, 196 (1901).

Cost
The United States assumed $4 million in Hawaiian debt as part of the annexation. David R. Barker of the University of Iowa stated in 2009 that unlike the Alaska Purchase, Hawaii has been profitable for the country, with net tax revenue almost always exceeding non-defense spending. He estimated an internal rate of return for the annexation of more than 15%.

Popular controversy

Multiple viewpoints in the United States and in Hawaii were raised for and against annexation from 1893 to 1898.
Historian Henry Graff wrote that at first, "Public opinion at home seemed to indicate acquiescence.... Unmistakably, the sentiment at home was maturing with immense force for the United States to join the great powers of the world in a quest for overseas colonies."

President Grover Cleveland, on taking office in March 1893, rescinded the annexation proposal. His biographer Alyn Brodsky argued that it was a deeply personal conviction on Cleveland's part to an immoral action against the little kingdom:
Just as he stood up for the Samoan Islands against Germany because he opposed the conquest of a lesser state by a greater one, so did he stand up for the Hawaiian Islands against his own nation. He could have let the annexation of Hawaii move inexorably to its inevitable culmination. But he opted for confrontation, which he hated, as it was to him the only way a weak and defenseless people might retain their independence. It was not the idea of annexation that Grover Cleveland opposed, but the idea of annexation as a pretext for illicit territorial acquisition.  

Cleveland had to mobilize support from Southern Democrats to fight the treaty. He sent former Georgia Representative James H. Blount as a special representative to Hawaii to investigate and to provide a solution. Blount was well known for his opposition to imperialism. Blount was also a leader for white supremacy, which ended the right to vote by southern Blacks in the 1890s. Some observers had speculated that he would support annexation on the grounds of the inability of Asiatics to govern themselves. Instead, Blount opposed imperialism, called for the US military to restore Queen Liliuokalani, and argued that the Hawaii natives should be allowed to continue their "Asiatic ways."

Blount seemingly was unaware of the written policy set for Hawaii in Cleveland's first term by his Secretary of State Thomas F. Bayard for Hawaii. Bayard sent written instructions to the American minister George W. Merrill that in the event of another revolution in Hawaii, it was a priority to protect American commerce, lives, and property. Bayard specified that "the assistance of the officers of our Government vessels, if found necessary, will therefore be promptly afforded to promote the reign of law and respect for orderly government in Hawaii." In July 1889, during a small-scale rebellion, Merrill landed Marines to protect Americans, an action that the State Department explicitly approved. Stevens had read those 1887 instructions and followed them in 1893.

A vigorous nationwide anti-expansionist movement, organized as the American Anti-Imperialist League, emerged that listened to Cleveland and Carl Schurz as well as Democratic leader William Jennings Bryan, industrialist Andrew Carnegie, author Mark Twain and sociologist William Graham Sumner, and many prominent intellectuals and politicians who came of age during the Civil War. The anti-imperialists opposed expansion and believed that imperialism violated the fundamental principle that just, republican government derives from "consent of the governed." The League argued that such activity would necessitate the abandonment of American ideals of self-government and non-intervention that were expressed in the Declaration of Independence, George Washington's Farewell Address, and Lincoln's Gettysburg Address.

However, they could not stop the even more energetic forces of imperialism, which were led by Secretary of State John Hay, naval strategist Alfred T. Mahan, Republican Senator Henry Cabot Lodge, Secretary of War Elihu Root, and the young politician Theodore Roosevelt. Those expansionists had vigorous support from newspaper publishers William Randolph Hearst and Joseph Pulitzer, who whipped up popular excitement. There was deep concern that Japan would take over Hawaii as part of its colonial empire, which would pose a serious threat to the West Coast. Mahan and Roosevelt designed a global strategy calling for a competitive modern navy, Pacific bases, an isthmian canal through Nicaragua or Panama, and (above all) an assertive role for America as the largest industrial power. McKinley's position was that Hawaii could never survive on its own but would quickly be gobbled up by Japan since already, a fourth of the islands' population was Japanese. That would allow Japan to dominate the Pacific and undermine American hopes for large-scale trade with Asia.

See also
 Hawaiian Organic Act, approved in 1900 by Congress to adopt a form of government for the new territory, in supplement of the Newlands Resolution.

References

Further reading
 Bailey, Thomas A. "Japan's Protest against the Annexation of Hawaii." Journal of Modern History 3.1 (1931): 46-61. online
 Bailey, Thomas A. "The United States and Hawaii during the Spanish–American War" American Historical Review 36#3 (1931), pp. 552-560 online
 Fry, Joseph A. "From Open Door to World Systems: Economic Interpretations of Late Nineteenth Century American Foreign Relations." Pacific Historical Review 65#2 (1996): 277-303.
 Hilfrich, Fabian. Debating American exceptionalism: empire and democracy in the wake of the Spanish–American War (Palgrave Macmillan, 2012)
 Holbo, Paul S. "Antiimperialism, Allegations, and the Aleutians: Debates Over the Annexation of Hawaii." (1982): 374-379. Reviews in American History 10#3 (1982) pp. 374-379 online
 Jessen, Nathan. “Hawaiian Annexation and the Beginning of the Debate Over Empire.” in Populism and Imperialism: Politics, Culture, and Foreign Policy in the American West, 1890-1900' '(U Press of Kansas, 2017), pp. 94–117. online

 Lozano, Henry Knight. “Emulation and Empire, 1880s–1890s.” in California and Hawai’i Bound: U.S. Settler Colonialism and the Pacific West, 1848-1959 (University of Nebraska Press, 2021), pp. 111–58. online
 Maass, Richard W. “To the Seas: Islands and U.S. Annexation.” in The Picky Eagle: How Democracy and Xenophobia Limited U.S. Territorial Expansion (Cornell University Press, 2020), pp. 156–98. online

 Morgan, William Michael.  Pacific Gibraltar: U.S.-Japanese Rivalry Over the Annexation of Hawaii, 1885-1898 (Naval Institute press, 2011).  See  online review by Kenneth R. Conklin, PhD
 Osborne, Thomas J. "Empire Can Wait": American Opposition to Hawaiian Annexation, 1893-1898 (Kent State University Press, 1981)
 Osborne, Thomas J. "The Main Reason for Hawaiian Annexation in July, 1898," Oregon Historical Quarterly (1970) 71#2 pp. 161–178  in JSTOR
 Osborne, Thomas J. "Trade or War? America's Annexation of Hawaii Reconsidered." Pacific Historical Review 50.3 (1981): 285-307. online
 Pratt, Julius William. Expansionists of 1898: The Acquisition of Hawaii and the Spanish Islands (1951).
 Russ, William Adam. The Hawaiian Republic (1894–98) and its struggle to win annexation (Susquehanna U Press, 1992), a major scholarly history
 Snowden, Emma. "Instant History: The Spanish–American War and Henry Watterson's Articulation of Anti-Imperialist Expansionism." Fairmount Folio: Journal of History'' (2016) 15:74-102. [file:///C:/2017/150-163-1-PB.pdf online]

External links

Text of the Newlands Resolution
morganreport.org Online images and transcriptions of the entire 1894 Morgan Report
 

Republic of Hawaii
.
Indigenous land rights in Hawaii
Race and law in the United States
United States federal territory and statehood legislation
1898 in American law
1898 in Hawaii
1898 in American politics
Annexation
Presidency of William McKinley
July 1898 events
1898 documents